Alloway is an unincorporated community in Cumberland County, Tennessee, in the United States.

The community was likely named for Archelus Alloway, an early settler.

References

Unincorporated communities in Cumberland County, Tennessee
Unincorporated communities in Tennessee